A Tale of Two Cities is a 1958 British film directed by Ralph Thomas and starring Dirk Bogarde and Dorothy Tutin. It is a period drama based on parts of Charles Dickens' novel A Tale of Two Cities (1859).

Plot
Sydney Carton, an alcoholic English lawyer, discovers that Charles Darnay, a man he once defended, is a French aristocrat trying to escape the French Revolution. While he envies the man over the love of a woman, Lucie Manette, his conscience is pricked and he resolves to help him escape the guillotine.

Cast
 Dirk Bogarde as Sydney Carton
 Dorothy Tutin as Lucie Manette
 Paul Guers as Charles Darnay (Voice dubbed by Tim Turner – uncredited)
 Marie Versini as Marie Gabelle
 Ian Bannen as Gabelle
 Alfie Bass as Jerry Cruncher
 Cecil Parker as Jarvis Lorry
 Stephen Murray as Dr. Manette
 Athene Seyler as Miss Pross
 Ernest Clark as Stryver
 Rosalie Crutchley as Madame Defarge
 Freda Jackson as the Vengeance
 Duncan Lamont as Ernest Defarge
 Leo McKern as Attorney General-Old Bailey
 Donald Pleasence as John Barsad
 Christopher Lee as Marquis St. Evremonde

Production
Ralph Thomas insisted on the film being shot in black and white as he felt the book "was written in black and white, and it's got to be made in black and white." He was influenced by a French film Casque d'Or set in a similar period which was in black and white.

Thomas later said this was a mistake and the commercial after-life of the film would have been stronger if it had been in colour. He said the film "was very self indulgent because I wouldn't listen to advice. It's dangerous to have fashion and power and I was fashionable then."

The film was the most expensive British production of its year.

The film was shot in the Loire Valley in France, because it was the only place without telegraph poles. Several thousand American soldiers posted nearby in Orléans were used as extras. Shooting took six weeks. "The only way we were able to finish a film this ambitious on such a modest budget was by using a regular crew, so there were no fights, we just tackled it and went on until the finish", said Thomas.

Critical reception
The New York Times wrote "it is mostly a bloodless and sober, albeit meticulous account that is spun here"; The Monthly Film Bulletin called it "an eminently respectable but scarcely distinguished addition to the list of filmed Dickens", noting that Rosalie Crutchley's "tirelessly bloodthirsty Mme Defarge – blatantly theatrical but full of gusto – is particularly welcome. This kind of vividness and life is exactly what the film as a whole lacks. However, AllMovie found "a respectable adaptation with a sterling lead performance (Bogarde)"; and TV Guide wrote "This version strives for the careful attention to detail that mark the best BBC-produced literary translations today....Perhaps this is not as melodramatic as the Hollywood version, but, to some, it is infinitely more satisfying."

References

External links
 
 
 
 
 
 A Tale of Two Cities at Britmovie

1958 films
1950s historical films
British historical films
Films directed by Ralph Thomas
Films shot at Pinewood Studios
British black-and-white films
Films based on A Tale of Two Cities
Films set in the 18th century
Films produced by Betty Box
Films scored by Richard Addinsell
Films set in London
Films set in Paris
1950s English-language films
1950s British films